The enzyme branched-chain-2-oxoacid decarboxylase catalyzes the chemical reaction

(3S)-3-methyl-2-oxopentanoate  2-methylbutanal + CO2

This enzyme belongs to the family of lyases, specifically the carboxy-lyases, which cleave carbon-carbon bonds.  The systematic name of this enzyme class is (3S)-3-methyl-2-oxopentanoate carboxy-lyase (2-methylbutanal-forming). Other names in common use include branched-chain oxo acid decarboxylase, branched-chain alpha-keto acid decarboxylase, branched-chain keto acid decarboxylase, BCKA, and (3S)-3-methyl-2-oxopentanoate carboxy-lyase.

References

 

EC 4.1.1
Enzymes of unknown structure